Spender was a BBC television drama between 1991 and 1993.

Spender may also refer to:

Spender (surname), list of people with the name
The Spender, 1913 American silent short romance film directed by Harry Solter
Big Spender, song written by Cy Coleman and Dorothy Fields for the musical Sweet Charity
Big Spender (TV series), American reality television series on the A&E Network